"You're My Heart, You're My Soul" is the first single by German duo Modern Talking released off their debut album The 1st Album. The single was released in September 1984 and entered the West German top 10 on 28 January 1985. It took another five weeks for the single to top the chart, spending six weeks at the summit and 25 weeks within the top 100, eventually reaching gold status for shipping over 500,000 units domestically. "You're My Heart, You're My Soul" is considered their best-selling single to date with worldwide sales said to exceed eight million copies.

The single was remixed in 1998, "You're My Heart, You're My Soul '98" for the duo's reunion. The single in a newer package gained a similar success again earning them a platinum-award for selling over 500,000 units in Germany alone.

Track listing
7-inch (Hansa 106 884) (BMG)  29.10.1984

12-inch (Hansa 601 496) (BMG)  29.10.1984

Charts

Weekly charts

Year-end charts

Certifications and sales

"You're My Heart, You're My Soul '98"

"You're My Heart, You're My Soul '98" is Modern Talking's first single released from the seventh album Back for Good, and it's the first single after their reunion in 1998. This is the re-packaged version of the original "You're My Heart, You're My Soul", which was released in 1984.

"You're My Heart, You're My Soul '98" was released in 1998. It was a number-one hit in Hungary and entered the top 5 in several countries including Germany, Switzerland, Austria, France, while entering the top 10 in many others including Sweden and Finland. In Germany, the single entered the top 10 on 6 April 1998, it peaked at number 2 the following week. After spending 10 weeks within the top 10, it eventually earned a platinum-award for selling over 500,000 units in Germany alone. In France, "You're My Heart, You're My Soul '98" peaked at no. 3 eventually earning a gold-award for selling over 250,000 units.

Track listings
*CD-Single Hansa 74321 58884 2 (BMG) 16.03.1998
   

*CD-Maxi Hansa 74321 57357 2 (BMG) / EAN 0743215735724	16.03.1998
   

UK maxi-single
UK: Hansa Records 74321 60812 2
"You're My Heart, You're My Soul (Modern Talking Mix '98)" – 3:53
"You're My Heart, You're My Soul (Original Long Mix '84)" – 5:33
"You're My Heart, You're My Soul 1998 (Paul Masterson's extended mix)" – 7:15

UK 12-inch maxi-single
BMG MT001
"You're My Heart, You're My Soul" (Paul Masterson extended mix) – 7:15
"You're My Heart, You're My Soul" (Paul Masterson dub) – 6:52
"You're My Heart, You're My Soul (Modern Talking Mix '98 feat. Eric Singleton)" – 3:15
"You're My Heart, You're My Soul (Original Long Mix '84)" – 5:36

Charts

Weekly charts

Year-end charts

Certifications and sales

Cover versions
In 2019, Modern Talking's composer and producer Dieter Bohlen recorded a German language version together with German pop singers Katja Krasavice and Pietro Lombardi. This cover entered at number 2 on the German charts.

See also
List of European number-one hits of 1985
List of number-one hits of 1985 (Germany)
List of number-one singles of the 1980s (Switzerland)

References

External links
Modern talking chart positions

1984 songs
1984 debut singles
1998 singles
2022 singles
Modern Talking songs
Pietro Lombardi (singer) songs
European Hot 100 Singles number-one singles
Hansa Records singles
Number-one singles in Austria
Number-one singles in Germany
Number-one singles in Hungary
Number-one singles in Switzerland
Song recordings produced by Dieter Bohlen
Songs written by Dieter Bohlen
Ultratop 50 Singles (Flanders) number-one singles